Waddell & Harrington was an American engineering company that designed bridges from 1907 to 1915.  It was formed in 1907 as a partnership of John Alexander Low Waddell (1854–1938) and John Lyle Harrington (1868–1942) and was based in Kansas City, Missouri, but had offices in Portland, Oregon, and Vancouver, British Columbia. The company designed more than 30 vertical-lift bridges for highways and railroads.

The firm also designed one or more non-lift bridges, including the Colorado Street Bridge of Pasadena, California.

A number of its works are listed on the U.S. National Register of Historic Places (NRHP).

Notable projects 
Bridges designed by the firm include the following, among others:

Hawthorne Bridge, spanning the Willamette River in Portland, Oregon, NRHP-listed
Interstate Bridge, spanning the Columbia River between Portland, Oregon, and Vancouver, Washington; NRHP-listed (as the Portland–Vancouver Highway Bridge)
Steel Bridge, spanning the Willamette River in Portland
Iowa Central Railway Bridge over the Mississippi River at Keithsburg, Illinois, built in 1909, since demolished
Caddo Lake Bridge, LA 538, over the Caddo Lake Mooringsport, LA, NRHP-listed 
City Waterway Bridge, 20th Ave., Spans Ravenna Park Ravine Tacoma, WA, NRHP-listed
Colorado Street Bridge, Colorado Blvd. Pasadena, CA, NRHP-listed
North 21st Street Bridge, spans Buckley Gulch, N. Fife and Oakes Tacoma, WA, NRHP-listed 
North 23rd Street Bridge, spans Buckley Gulch, N. Fife and Oakes Tacoma, WA, NRHP-listed
Union Street Railroad Bridge and Trestle, Jct of Union St. NE and Water St. NE Salem, OR), NRHP-listed
ASB Bridge over the Missouri River at Kansas City

References

American engineers
Companies based in Kansas City, Missouri
American companies established in 1907
Design companies disestablished in 1915
Construction and civil engineering companies of the United States
Defunct engineering companies of the United States
Transportation in Portland, Oregon
Construction and civil engineering companies established in 1907